#HimToo is a social movement supporting male victims of sexual assault and false rape allegations. This reaction to the MeToo movement started in October 2018 after a tweet from a mother about her son being afraid to date because of a climate of false rape allegations. It rose to greater prominence during the Brett Kavanaugh Supreme Court nomination. The #HimToo movement is seen as a response to the sexual assault allegations from the #MeToo movement.

History 
The meaning of the #HimToo hashtag has constantly changed throughout the course of its existence. When it was first used before 2015, #HimToo had no political meaning attached to it. It was simply an acknowledgement to the participation or presence of a male in an activity.

#HimToo first began to carry a political connotation in 2016, although it was still not used for issues regarding rape allegations or gender related issues. Instead, it was a way of showing support for Senator Tim Kaine of Virginia, Hillary Clinton's running-mate in the 2016 United States presidential election. During that time period, the hashtag #ImWithHer referred to Clinton, while #HimToo was connected to Kaine. Eventually, Donald Trump's supporters used the same hashtag #HimToo to criticize Hillary Clinton and Barack Obama, using #LockHerUp followed by #HimToo.

#HimToo became connected with rape allegations following the emergence of the #MeToo movement when a mother in the United States tweeted about her son with the #HimToo hashtag. She claimed that her son, Pieter Hanson, was afraid to go on dates because of false rape allegations. Hanson himself disavowed his mother's tweet, saying that he does not avoid dating for fear of being falsely accused of sexual misconduct, he never has and never will support #HimToo, and that he supports the #MeToo movement. However, the hashtag became increasingly popular for criticizing rape allegations, especially after actress Asia Argento, one of the major leaders of the #MeToo movement, was accused of sexually assaulting actor Jimmy Bennett when he was a minor and paying him $380,000 as part of a nondisclosure settlement. 

During the Brett Kavanaugh hearings, the #HimToo hashtag was re-popularized in his defense. People used the #HimToo hashtag to express support for Kavanaugh and to criticize women who allegedly gave false rape accusations. The hashtag then evolved and became more generally used to defend men against false rape accusations. #HimToo became the antithesis to #MeToo as a call for fairness towards men during sexual assault hearings by asserting that men should not be implied as guilty before sexual assault hearings begin.

#HimToo rally 
On November 17, 2018, a rally supporting the #HimToo movement hosted by Patriot Prayer member Haley Adams was held in downtown Portland, Oregon. According to Adams, she and about 40 others gathered to show support for men who were victims of false rape allegations, which they blamed the #MeToo movement for. The speakers shared stories of false rape accusations and spoke about other points regarding "men's rights". Joey Gibson, the leader of the Patriot Prayer movement, spoke at the #HimToo rally. Many of the rally's attendees and speakers were associated with Gibson and the Patriot Prayer group.

A counter-protest attended by 350 people was held nearby to express their support for victims of sexual assault in light of the #MeToo movement under a banner saying "Survivors are Everywhere". Among the attendees were various different left wing groups including antifascists dressed in "black bloc" outfits, members of the Portland Democratic Socialists of America (DSA), and the group Popular Mobilizations which led a counter-protest rally called #SupportersAreEverywhere.

After the rally held by the right-wing group, a larger number of anti-fascist protesters from the left-wing rally chased them. The protesters allegedly started using pepper spray and fireworks, as well as tossing bottles, flares, silly string, and smoke bombs. The police then placed a protective wall around the right wingers who were left. The opposing rallies ended in six arrests.

Alternative views 
Although the Him Too movement remains largely associated with highlighting the false rape allegations that men have faced, some argue the movement has been used in other ways. During the rise of the Me Too movement, the Him Too movement began to take on a new meaning of supporting men who have been victims of sexual harassment and violence themselves.

Criticism 
Criticism of the Him Too movement primarily focuses on how it misrepresents the frequency of false sexual assault allegations. 

Critics also claim that the HimToo movement discourages men who do deal with sexual abuse from coming forward because HimToo creates a gendered dichotomy where men are the accused and women make the accusations. They state that HimToo movement discredits the idea that men can be sexually assaulted as well, and casts doubt that those who come forward can be believed.

See also

 "A Scary Time"
 Hashtag activism
 MenToo movement

References 

2018 in Internet culture
Articles containing video clips
False allegations of sex crimes
Internet-based activism
MeToo movement